Jewel Renee Peterson  (born September 10, 1981) is an American former professional tennis player.

Peterson, born and raised in College Park, Georgia, played collegiate tennis at the University of Southern California (USC). While at USC she was a four-time All-American and an NCAA semi-finalist as a senior in 2003.

A right-handed player, Peterson reached a career high singles ranking of 214 in the world and qualified for the main draw of the 2005 Miami Open. She featured in both doubles main draws at the 2004 US Open, partnering Alexandra Mueller in the women's and Phillip Simmonds in the mixed event.

Peterson was a childhood coach of Coco Gauff in Atlanta.

ITF finals

Singles: 2 (0–2)

References

External links
 
 

1981 births
Living people
American female tennis players
Tennis people from Georgia (U.S. state)
USC Trojans women's tennis players
Sportspeople from College Park, Georgia